Lleyton Hewitt was the defending champion, but chose not to participate that year.

Roger Federer won in the final 5–7, 7–5, 7–6(7–5), against Ivan Ljubičić.

Seeds

  Roger Federer (champion)
  Guillermo Coria (second round)
  Tim Henman (quarterfinals)
  David Nalbandian (first round)
  Joachim Johansson (second round)
  Nikolay Davydenko (quarterfinals)
  Dominik Hrbatý (first round)
  Feliciano López (first round)

Draw

Finals

Top half

Bottom half

External links
 Main Draw
 Qualifying draw

Singles
2005 ATP Tour